Return to Sender is a 1963 British drama directed and edited by Gordon Hales and starring Nigel Davenport, Yvonne Romain and Geoffrey Keen. It was made at Merton Park Studios as part of the long-running series of Edgar Wallace adaptations.

Plot
A corporate fraudster is arrested for stealing a large sum of money from his partners. When he learns that the prosecuting counsel is led by a particularly brilliant barrister, he attempts to undermine the barrister's credibility by employing a shady individual to use smear tactics against him.

Cast
Nigel Davenport as Dino Steffano
Yvonne Romain as Lisa
Geoffrey Keen as Robert Lindley
William Russell as Mike Cochrane
Jennifer Daniel as Beth
Paul Williamson as Tony Shaw
John Horsley as Supt. Gilchrist
Gerald Andersen as Lloyd
Richard Bird as Fox
Marianne Stone as Kate
Lucy Griffiths as Agatha

References

External links
Return to Sender at BBFC
Return to Sender at BFI

1963 films
British drama films
1963 drama films
Edgar Wallace Mysteries
British black-and-white films
1960s English-language films
1960s British films